The Switzer Covered Bridge, located off Rocky Branch Rd., over North Elkhorn Creek, in or near Switzer, Kentucky, was built around 1855.  It was listed on the National Register of Historic Places in 1974.

It was built by George Hockensmith.

The bridge was threatened with destruction in 1953, but was saved. In March 1997, it was knocked from its foundation by high water and was later rebuilt again that year  Instead of destroying and replacing this bridge.

References

Covered bridges on the National Register of Historic Places in Kentucky
National Register of Historic Places in Franklin County, Kentucky
Bridges completed in 1855
Transportation in Franklin County, Kentucky
Wooden bridges in Kentucky
Rebuilt buildings and structures in the United States
1855 establishments in Kentucky